Erythromycin 3''-O-methyltransferase (EryG) is an enzyme with systematic name S-adenosyl-L-methionine:erythromycin C 3''-O-methyltransferase. This enzyme catalyses the following chemical reaction

 (1) S-adenosyl-L-methionine + erythromycin C  S-adenosyl-L-homocysteine + erythromycin A
 (2) S-adenosyl-L-methionine + erythromycin D  S-adenosyl-L-homocysteine + erythromycin B

The enzyme methylates the 3 position of the mycarosyl moiety of erythromycin C.

References

External links 
 

EC 2.1.1